Events from 1946 in England

Incumbent
Monarch - George VI

Prime Minister - Clement Attlee

Events

January

February

March

April

May

June
 8 June – a victory parade is held in London to celebrate the end of World War II.

July

August

September

October

November

December

Births

21 February – Alan Rickman, actor and director (died 2016)
25 September – Felicity Kendal, actress
12 September – Neil Lyndon, journalist and writer

Deaths
11 July – Paul Nash, artist (born 1889)

See also
1946 in Northern Ireland
1946 in Scotland
1946 in Wales

References

 
England
Years of the 20th century in England
1940s in England